The Britzer Garten (English: Britzer Garden) is a large park in Berlin, named after Britz, a neighborhood of the borough of Neukölln. It was constructed for the Bundesgartenschau 1985, in order to provide a new landscape park to the citizens in the southeast of West-Berlin, who were at that time cut off from the surrounding countryside.

About 
Visitors are charged a small entrance fee at the gates. The main entrance is situated at the Buckower Damm, near the park cemetery in Neukölln. Dogs and bicycles are not allowed.

Architecture and art play a vital role in the park. It was planned by architects Juergen Dirk Zilling, Jasper Halfmann and Klaus Zillich. The "Café am See" was built in 1985 by the architect Engelbert Kremser, using his earthwork technology. The sculpture , artwork in the Britzer Garten by artist  is at the entrance. Many special events also take place there, including concerts (classical and other) sometimes accompanied by fireworks.

The Britzer Museumsbahn (English: Britzer Museum Railway), runs on a narrow-gauge track through the Britzer Garten. Some engines and cars are remakes of historical models.

The Britzer Garten belongs to the Grün Berlin Park und Garten GmbH company, which is owned by the city of Berlin. Other places of attraction run by this company are the Britzer Mühle, the Erholungspark Marzahn (opened as the "Berliner Gartenschau" 1987) and the Natur-Park Schöneberger Südgelände (a former EXPO 2000-project).

Bibliography 
 Clemens Alexander Wimmer: Parks und Gärten in Berlin und Potsdam; ed. Senator für Stadtentwicklung und Umweltschutz, Abt. III – Gartendenkmalpflege; Nicolaische Verlagsbuchhandlung: 3. Aufl. Berlin 1989; ; S. 84-91.

References

External links 

 

Parks in Berlin
Neukölln
1985 establishments in Germany